Lot ([ɔl]) is a department in the Occitanie region of France. Named after the Lot River, it lies in the southwestern part of the country and had a population of 174,094 in 2019. Its prefecture is Cahors; its subprefectures are Figeac and Gourdon.

History 
Lot is one of the original 83 departments created during the French Revolution on 4 March 1790. It was created from part of the province of Quercy. In 1808 some of the original southeastern cantons were separated from it to form the department of Tarn-et-Garonne. It originally extended much farther to the south and included the city of Montauban.

Geography 

Lot is part of the region of Occitanie and is surrounded by the departments of Corrèze, Cantal, Aveyron, Tarn-et-Garonne, Lot-et-Garonne and Dordogne.

Cahors is the prefecture of the department, lying in its southwestern part: a medieval cathedral town known internationally for its production of Cahors wine, it lies in a wide loop of the Lot River and is famous for its 14th-century bridge, the Pont Valentré. Figeac is a medieval town where Jean-François Champollion, the first translator of Egyptian hieroglyphics, was born, situated in the eastern part of Lot. Gourdon, a medieval hilltop town located in Lot's northwestern part, with a well preserved centre, comprises many prehistoric painted caves nearby, notably the Grottes de Cougnac.

Principal towns

The most populous commune is Cahors, the prefecture. As of 2019, there are 7 communes with more than 3,000 inhabitants:

Demographics 
The inhabitants of Lot are called Lotois and Lotoises in French. Population development since 1801:

Politics

Departmental Council of Lot
The Departmental Council of Lot has 34 seats. Since the 2015 departmental elections, 30 are controlled by the Socialist Party (PS) and its allies; 4 are controlled by the miscellaneous right. Since 2014, the President of the Departmental Council has been Serge Rigal, currently a member of La République En Marche! (REM).

Members of the National Assembly
Lot elected the following members of the National Assembly during the 2017 legislative election:

Senators
Lot is represented in the Senate by Angèle Préville (since 2017) and Jean-Claude Requier (since 2011).

Tourism

See also
Cantons of the Lot department
Communes of the Lot department

References

External links

  Prefecture website
  Departmental Council website
  hiking the Tour du Lot
  CazalRando groupe de randonnée pédestre website

 
Massif Central
1790 establishments in France
Departments of Occitania (administrative region)
States and territories established in 1790